Bushy Islet is a one-mile-long islet in Queensland, Australia about  from Woody Island and  from Quoin Island in the Great Barrier Reef Marine Park of Queensland, Australia.

Bushy Islet is part of Macarthur Islands.

See also

 List of islands of Australia

References

Islands on the Great Barrier Reef
Uninhabited islands of Australia
Islands of Far North Queensland